Shmuel Trigano (born in 1948 in Blida, French Algeria) is a sociologist, philosopher, professor emeritus of sociology at Paris Nanterre University (Chair "Sociology of knowledge, religion and politics" ). He was Tikvah Fund Visiting Professor in Jewish Law and Thought at Benjamin N. Cardozo School of Law, New York (2009), and Templeton Fellow at the Herzl Institute (Jerusalem) program "Philosophy of the Tanakh, Midrash and Talmud" (2012-2013), (2015-2017). Elia Benamozegh European Chair of Sephardic Studies, Livorno, Italy (2002).

Trigano is Bachelor of Arts (at the Hebrew University of Jerusalem - Political Science, International Relations), M.A. in Political Science (Paris II University 1977), PhD in Political Sociology at Paris Nanterre University ("The religious genesis of the Political Modernity in Judaism" - 1981). Received the Accreditation to supervise doctoral research, (Paris X- Nanterre): "The foundations of a social morphology of judaism" (1990).

Trigano developed, in the domain of Jewish thought, history and society of the Jews a method that combines academic knowledge with metaphysics, political philosophy and social sciences. Combining speculative and academic books, he built an original thought, which goes through all these fields. The challenge of Jewish modernity and the actualization of Jewish thought are at the heart of his work.

Trigano founded and edited two journals:
 The Journal of Jewish Studies "Pardes, Revue européenne d'études juives", Ed. du Cerf, In-Press Editions (1985- today). Co-founded with Annie Kriegel (1926-1995).
 The Journal of Political Ideas "Controverses" Ed. De l’Eclat (2006- 2011).

Trigano founded and managed three institutions
 The Alliance Israélite Universelle College of Jewish Studies (Collège des Etudes Juives), (1986 - 2013): Cultural and intellectual (not delivering academic degrees but with an academic level) institution opened to adults who intend to study Judaism in a dialogue with contemporary culture and questioning). See programs: 
 The Observatoire du monde juif : Institute of Research on Antisemitism and Jewish Affairs (2001-2011), publication of numerous studies and bulletins on the "New antisemitism".
 The Université populaire du judaïsme (2013- today): Cultural and intellectual (not delivering academic degrees but with an academic level) institution opened to adults who intend to study Judaism in a dialogue with contemporary culture and questioning). More than 2000 inscribed students around the world.

Trigano co-founded and manages Dialogia, an Israeli association to promote the conversation between French Jewish Thought and the Israeli intellectual debate, 2017-

Prizes
 Edmond Tenoudji Prize for Jewish Education, 1993.
 French Jewry Foundation, Francine and Antoine Bernheim Prize, Prize for the Sciences, 2011.
 The Impertinents 2013 Prize of the newspaper Le Figaro, for his book "La Nouvelle idéologie dominante"

Books
 LE RÉCIT DE LA DISPARUE, essai sur l'identité juive (The tale of the disappeared-She, an essay about Jewish Identity) ; Gallimard Les Essais 1977, Folio-Gallimard, 2001
 LA NOUVELLE QUESTION JUIVE ; Gallimard Idées 1982, Folio-Gallimard, 2002
 LA RÉPUBLIQUE ET LES JUIFS ; Les Presses d'aujourd'hui 1982
 LA DEMEURE OUBLIEE, genèse religieuse du politique (The Forgotten Mansion, a Religious Genesis of Politics) ; Lieu Commun 1984, Tel- Gallimard 1994, Italian translation Alle radici della modernità, ECIG, 1999
 PHILOSOPHIE DE LA LOI, l'origine de la politique dans la Tora ; Le Cerf 1991, English translation by Gila Walker, Philosophy of the Law. The Political in the Torah, Shalem Press,
 UN EXIL SANS RETOUR? lettres à un Juif égaré (Exile without return ? Letters to a Perplexed Jew); Stock 1996
 LA SEPARATION D’AMOUR, une éthique d’alliance (The separation of Love, a Covenantal Ethics); Arléa, 1998
 L’IDEAL DEMOCRATIQUE A L’EPREUVE DE LA SHOA(The uniqueness of the Shoa and the democratic universal ); Odile Jacob ed. Paris 1999, translation in English by Gila Walker, The Democratic Ideal, The Unthought in Political Modernity, SUNY Press, 2009. Translation in Hebrew by Avner Lahav, Haideal hademokrati bemivhan hashoah, Ben Gurion Institute, Ben Gurion University of the Negev, 2009.
 LE MONOTHÉÏSME EST UN HUMANISME (Monotheism is a humanism) ; Odile Jacob ed. 2000
 LE TEMPS DE L’EXIL (The time of exile) ; Manuels-Payot, 2001, Rivages poche/Petite Bibliothèque, 2005, translation in Italian, Il tempo dell’esilio, Giuntina, 2010
 QU’EST-CE QUE LA RELIGION? (What is religion?); Flammarion, 2001
 LA MEMORIA DEL POPOLO SCOMPARSO, Salomone Belforte & Co, 2003
 L’EBRANLEMENT D’ISRAËL. PHILOSOPHIE DE L’HISTOIRE JUIVE (The shaking of Israel, a Jewish Philosophy of History); Le Seuil, 2002, translation in Italian, Il Terremoto di Israele, Giuda Judaica, 2007.
 L’E(XC)LU, ENTRE JUIFS ET CHRETIENS (The Chosen-Expelled : Between Jews and Christians); Denoël, 2003
 LA DEMISSION DE LA REPUBLIQUE, JUIFS ET MUSULMANS EN FRANCE (The Republican Abdication : Jews and Muslims in France) ; P.U.F., 2003
 LES FRONTIÈRES D’AUSCHWITZ. Les ravages du devoir de mémoire, (Auschwitz Frontiers, the Ravages of the « Duty of Memory »), Hachette-Livre de Poche, 2005, translated in Hebrew by Avner Lahav (Resling, 2016)
 L’AVENIR DES JUIFS DE France (The Future of French Jewry), Grasset, 2006
 L’INTENTION D’AMOUR, Désir et sexualité dans Les maîtres de l’âme de R. Abraham Ben David de Posquières, (The Intent of Love, Desire and Sex in Rabad’s Baalei Hanefesh), Éditions de l’éclat, 2007.
 LE JUDAÏSME ET L’ESPRIT DU MONDE, (Judaism and the Spirit of the World), Grasset, 2011.
 LA NOUVELLE IDEOLOGIE DOMINANTE, (The New Dominant Ideology), Editions Hermann, 2012.
 LE PEUPLE JUIF, SOCIOLOGIE ET PHILOSOPHIE POLITIQUES (The Jewish People, Political Sociology and Philosophy), François Bourin ed. 2013.
 L'HÉBREU, UNE PHILOSOPHIE, (Hebrew as a Philosophy), Hermann-Philosophie, 2014
 QUINZE ANS DE SOLITUDE. JUÏFS DE FRANCE: 2000–2015, (Fifteen Years of Loneliness. French Jews 2000-2015) Berg International, 2015
 LE NOUVEL ÉTAT JUIF, (The New Jewish State ), Berg International, 2015

Main edited books
 Le second Israël ; Les Temps Modernes, n° 394 bis, Mai 1979
 Penser Auschwitz; Pardès n°9-10, 1989
 La société juive a travers l'histoire ; Fayard, 1992-1993, 4 volumes:
 La fabrique du peuple
 Les liens de l’alliance
 Le passage d’Israël
 Le peuple monde
 L'école de pensée juive de Paris ; Pardès 23, 1997
 Le sionisme face à ses détracteurs ; Editions Raphaël, 2002
 L’exclusion des Juifs des pays arabes ; Pardès 33, 2003
 L’identité des Juifs d’Algérie ; Nadir, 2004
 La Cité biblique, Pardès, 40,2006
 Le monde sépharade, en deux volumes aux Editions du Seuil (2007)
 L’Histoire
 La Civilisation
 Noirs et Juifs, mythes et réalités, Pardès (42/2007)
 La civilisation du judaïsme, L’Eclat, 2012.
 La mémoire sépharade (co-editor, Helene Trigano) ; In Press, 2000
 Voulons-nous encore être humains ? Possibilités et limites d’un nouvel humanisme occidental; Diogene, 2001. (English version: "Do we still want to be Human?"

Fields of research
Jewish Thought, Philosophy, Jewish History, Social Sciences, Socio-History, Sociology and Anthropology of Politics, Science of Religions.

The book (1056 pages) « Judaism and the Spirit of the World » (2011) opens a building site for a new development of the approach to Judaism. It may be seen as a program of research. It deals with 4 matters : Religion and Theology, Political Sociology and Anthropology, Ethos and Morals, Aura of Judaism in the Monotheistic Religions and Western Modernity.

Editorial boards
Jewish Political Studies, Jerusalem
Gesher, Journal of Jewish Affairs, World Jewish Congress, Jerusalem
Hebraic Political Studies, Rutgers University

Current matters and topics
Elaboration of a Global Theory of Judaism
Prospective on the Continuous Creativity of Jewish Thought
Epistemology of Jewish Studies
Political philosophy of Judaism
Political sociology of Judaism
Theory of Authority in Judaism
Construction and Morphology of Jewish History , Society, and Civilization
The Ethos of the three Structural trends of Judaism
The Theology of Judaism
Biblical Thought
Development of a New Jewish Hermeneutics
Jewish Modernity (Emancipation and French Jewry Model)
Modernity at large, « Post-Modernity »
Global strategical analysis of the Jewish condition

References

External links
 Personal website
 Bibliography

French sociologists
Sociologists of religion
Academic staff of the University of Paris
French essayists
French male essayists
Algerian Jews
Jewish writers
Algerian emigrants to France
People from Blida
Jewish philosophers
1948 births
Living people